Denitrovibrio is a Gram-negative, mesophilic and obligately anaerobic genus of bacteria from the family of Deferribacteraceae with one known species (Denitrovibrio acetiphilus). The complete genome of Denitrovibrio acetiphilus is sequenced.

References

Taxa described in 2000
Deferribacterota
Bacteria genera
Monotypic bacteria genera